The 2013 season is Selangor FA's 8th season playing in Malaysia Super League. They also competed in two domestic cups, Malaysia FA Cup and Malaysia Cup.

Players

First Team Squad

Transfers
Source:

Transfers In

Transfers Out

Competitions

Overall

Overview

Malaysia Super League

Results summary

Results by round

Selangor FA Results
Fixtures and Results of the Malaysia Super League 2013 season.

Malaysia Super League

Results Overview

Top scorers

Malaysia FA Cup

First round

Second round

Quarter-finals

|}

AFC Cup

Group stage 

Group H

Tiebreakers
Selangor are ranked ahead of Sài Gòn Xuân Thành on head-to-head record.

Notes

Knockout stage

Malaysia Cup

Group stage

Group A

References

Selangor
Selangor FA